The discography of the Sqeezer, a German Dance and pop group, consists of two studio albums, twelve singles, including two as a featured artist, three promotional singles, and 14 music videos, including two as featured artist. The first release was the group's debut album Drop Your Pants in 1996, followed by the sophomore release Streetlife in 1998. After a string of single releases, such as "High Heels" along with other songs "Anybody" and "No Goodbye", a third album, titled Reloaded, was planned for release around 2008. However the release was shelved. In 2013 and 2014, "Sex With A Rockstar" and "Crazy Love" were in process, before the disbandment due to Reeves death in 2016.

Albums

Studio albums

Unreleased albums

Singles

Featured singles

Promotional singles

Other appearances

Music videos

Featured music videos

References

Discographies of German artists